Petit-Nobressard (Luxembourgish: Kleng Elchert) is a village in northwestern Luxembourg.

It is situated in the commune of Ell and has a population of 159.

Gallery

References 

Villages in Luxembourg